The women's pole vault event at the 2009 Asian Athletics Championships was held at the Guangdong Olympic Stadium on November 12.

Results

References
Results

2009 Asian Athletics Championships
Pole vault at the Asian Athletics Championships
2009 in women's athletics